Nina Nikolayevna Frolova (born 11 October 1948) is a retired Soviet rowing cox. She was the first Soviet cox who was promoted to the honored master of sport.

References 
 
 
 Rudern – Europameisterschaften (Damen – Vierer m.Stfr.), Rudern – Europameisterschaften (Damen – Achter), Rudern – Weltmeisterschaften – Vierer mit Steuerfrau, Rudern – Weltmeisterschaften – Achter – Damen. sport-komplett.de
 Гребля. spartak70.ru
 Photo

1948 births
Living people
Russian female rowers
Soviet female rowers
Rowers at the 1980 Summer Olympics
Olympic silver medalists for the Soviet Union
Coxswains (rowing)
Olympic rowers of the Soviet Union
Olympic medalists in rowing
World Rowing Championships medalists for the Soviet Union
Medalists at the 1980 Summer Olympics
European Rowing Championships medalists